Sopheap Pich (born 1971) is a Cambodian American contemporary artist. His sculptures utilize traditional Cambodian materials, which reflect the history of the nation and the artist's relation to his identity.

Early work and influences
Sopheap Pich was born in Battambang, Cambodia (then known as the Khmer Republic) in 1971. He spent his childhood there until 1984, when he moved at age 13 to the United States of America. In 7th grade in the U.S., he enrolled into a school with a classroom setting and a teacher for the first time. He continued with his education at the University of Massachusetts Amherst, and in 2002 got his MFA at School of the Art Institute of Chicago. 

In 2002, he returned to Cambodia, to the same place he had evacuated from in formative years because of the refugee crisis. Pich's trip back home renewed and reunited him with his cultural identity, which impacts his artwork. He uses local material mostly found in Cambodia, for example, bamboo. Pich creates a wide range of different of works from sculptures to paints. His sculptures are usually quite large, and some are high enough to touch the top of an art gallery's ceiling. Many of his first creations were destroyed and recycled because there was no place to store them. He has many of the only rare photographs of this first works. One early painting from 1995, titled 'Conch's Flight' was done on two canvases.  It is preserved and is in a private collection.

Style and materials
Sopheap Pich uses very specific materials in his work, related to his native Cambodia. His installation The Room consisted of bamboo sticks and dye. Other materials include: 
 Rattan 
 Resin 
 Plywood 
 Bamboo 
 Metal 
 Wire 
 Dye 
 Glue

Pich's style aims to be non-autobiographical, but he embraces the materials from his native country to depict its past. Trained as a painter, Pich later experimented with sculpting, and manipulating materials. He realized that sculpture was a way to be physically intimate with his environment. He manipulates his materials through boiling, cutting, bending, burning and dying. He lets the materials mostly speak for themselves, with no hidden narrative. His pieces are very environmental, and inexpensive looking. They are meant to look as though the time put in was worth more than the monetary value of the materials themselves.

Pich is a versatile artist, who not only works with weaving, but also sculpture and prints.

Major works

Reliefs (2013)
Reliefs was Pich's third solo exhibition at the Tyler Rollins Fine Arts Gallery, and featured over ten different sculptural works. His reliefs represents how the artist explores the grid. Reliefs are made of rattan grids and covered with strips of burlap that were originally used from rice bags. The bags had already been repaired with string and twine. All of the works in the series are used with just two colors: mainly black and a little red. The red is made from powdered clay and the black is made from charcoal. These materials relate to Pich's work because they came from Cambodia, and he uses each material as a story that is a part of his culture. The grids, burlap, and strings are all exhibits of the detailed and perfected parts of Pich's work that he wanted to be noticed. He wanted to show a sense of fine execution in his craftmanship.

Morning Glory (2011)
Morning Glory, a 17.5 feet long sculpture, was first exhibited in 2011 at the Tyler Rollins Fine Arts gallery as part of Sopheap Pich's second solo show. Like many of his works, the sculpture is made of rattan and bamboo, materials that are specific to Southeast Asia, although it also includes plywood, wire and steel bolts. Pich's memories of the Khmer Rouge period are reflected in this piece. The morning glory, a common flower, was a main source of food in Cambodia during the dictatorship that ran from 1975 to 1979. In addition to mass murders, the Khmer Rouge rule led to famine, so the plant had a particular importance in people's survival. Its tentacular stems and buds are intertwined, and at the end opens in a wide flower. Its frail appearance and beauty contrasts with the atrocities that Cambodian people have experienced.

A Room (2014)
A commission from the Indianapolis Museum of Art, A Room is a 40-feet long installation made of 1,200 bamboo strips. It was installed in the fall of 2014 in the museum's atrium. Pich wanted the installation to have an effect on the visitors, "in an emotional kind of way", so the installation is an immersive experience for the visitors, who can touch it and interact with it. Following the pattern of his works, the piece is inspired from Cambodia, and particularly the big temples that convey a sense of calm, and are real pieces of art. Bamboo is a natural material widely available in Cambodia. The absence of shops dedicated to art led Sopheap Pich to look into what was naturally present in the environment, but also to use more available supplies like common house paint and glue.

See also
Cambodian art

Exhibitions
Solo exhibitions
 1997 - Empty Wooden Cigarette Boxes From Cambodia, The Augusta Savage Gallery, Amherst, MA
 2002 - Recent Works, The Brewery Studio, Boston, MA
 2003 - Excavating the Vessels, Java Café and Gallery, Phnom Penh, Cambodia
 2004 - Pdao, French Cultural Center Phnom Penh, Cambodia
 2005 - Chomlak, sculptures and drawings, The Arts Lounge of Hotel de la Paix, Siem Reap, Cambodia
 2005 - Sculptures and Drawings, Amansara Resort, Siem Reap, Cambodia
 2006 - Moha Saen Anett, Gallery Dong Xi, Vestfossen, Norway
 2007 - Recent Works From Kunming, TCG/Nordica, Kunming, China
 2007 - Tidal, H Gallery, Bangkok, Thailand
 2007 - Flow, Sala Artspace, Phnom Penh, Cambodia
 2008 - Strands, The Esplanade, Singapore
 2009 - The Pulse Within, Tyler Rollins Fine Art, New York, NY
 2010 - Fragile, French Cultural Center, Phnom Penh, Cambodia
 2011 - Morning Glory, Tyler Rollins Fine Art, New York, NY
 2011 - Compound, The Henry Art Gallery, University of Washington, Seattle, WA
 2012 - In Spite of Order, H Gallery, Bangkok, Thailand
 2013 - Cambodian Rattan: The Sculptures of Sopheap Pich, Metropolitan Museum of Art, New York, NY
 2013 - Compound, Brookfiled Place Winter Garden, New York, NY
 2013 - Reliefs, Tyler Rollins Fine Art, New York, NY
 2013 - Collection+ Sopheap Pich, Sherman Contemporary Art Foundation, Sydney, Australia
 2014 - Sopheap Pich: A Room, Indianapolis Museum of Art, Indianapolis, IN
 2015 - Structures, Tyler Rollins Fine Art, New York, NY

Group exhibitions
 1995 - Recent Paintings, Gallery Del Sol, Miami, FL
 1995 - BFA Thesis Show, The Augusta Savage Gallery, University of Massachusetts, Amherst, MA
 1998 - Presidential Dinner Exhibition, The Art Institute of Chicago, Chicago, IL
 1999 - Altered Object, Hyde Park Arts Center, Chicago, IL
 1999 - Young Talents II, Contemporary Arts Workshop, Chicago, IL
 1999 - MFA Thesis Exhibition, G2, The School of the Art Institute of Chicago, Chicago, IL
 1999 - Yellow/Face, Gallery Pilson East, Chicago, IL
 1999 - Cows on Parade, a collaborative project with J. Zakin and S. Biggers for The Chicago Park District, exhibited at the Field Museum Campus, Chicago, IL
 2000 - Just Good Art 2000, Hyde Park Arts Center, Chicago, IL
 2000 - Memory: Personal and Social Testimonies, the Augusta Savage Gallery, University of Massachusetts, Amherst, MA
 2001 - Subject Picture, The Optimistic, Chicago, IL
 2004 - Guide, French Cultural Center Siem Reap, Cambodia
 2004 - Continuity, Shinta Mani, Siem Reap, Cambodia
 2004 - Guide, French Cultural Center, Phnom Penh, Cambodia
 2004 - Meik Sratum, Silapak Khmer Amatak, Phnom Penh, Cambodia
 2005 - Visual Arts Open, Elsewhere and New Art Gallery, Phnom Penh, Cambodia
 2005 - Transit, with Michèle Vanvlasselaer, Java Café & Gallery, Phnom Penh, Cambodia
 2005 - Première Vue, Passage de Retz, Paris, France
 2005 - Je/Jeu, French Cultural Center, Yangon, Myanmar
 2006 - Paint Around the Dog, with Jack Bauer, Lake Studio, Phnom Penh, Cambodia
 2006 - 2+3+4 Cambodian/Vietnamese Exchange, Java Cafe and Gallery, Phnom Penh, Cambodia
 2008 - Sh Contemporary: Best of Discovery, Shanghai, China
 2008 - Strategies from Within, Ke Center for the Contemporary Arts, Shanghai, China
 2008 - The Mekong Project, Thailand, Cambodia, Vietnam, Laos
 2008 - The Drawing Room, Rubies, Phnom Penh, Cambodia
 2009 - Asia-Pacific Triennial of Contemporary Art, Queensland Art Gallery | Gallery of Modern Art, Brisbane, Australia
 2009 - Fukuoka Asian Art Triennale, Fukoka Asian Art Museum, Fukuoka, Japan
 2009 - Truly Truthful, Art Asia, Miami, FL
 2009 - Forever Until Now: Contemporary Art from Cambodia, 10 Chancery Lane Gallery, Hong Kong
 2010 - Classic Contemporary: Contemporary Southeast Asian Art from the Singapore Art Museum Collection, Singapore Art Museum, Singapore
 2011 - Asian Art Biennial, Taiwan
 2011 - Singapore Biennale, Singapore
 2011 - Here / Not Here: Buddha Presence in Eight Recent Works, Asian Art Museum of San Francisco, San Francisco, CA
 2012 - documenta(13), Kassel, Germany
 2012 - Invisible Cities, MASS MoCA, North Adams, MA
 2012 - Encounter: The Royal Academy in Asia, Asia Institute of Contemporary Art, Lasalle College of the Arts, Singapore
 2012 - DEEP S.E.A., Primo Marella, Rome, Italy
 2013 - Moscow Biennale, Moscow, Russia
 2013 - Dojima River Bienniale, Dojima River Forum, Osaka, Japan
 2013 - Collecting Art of Asia, Smith College Museum of Art, Northampton, MA
 2013 - Connect: Phnom Penh: Rescue Archaeology – Contemporary Art and Urban Development in Cambodia, IFA-Galerie, Berlin, Germany
 2013 - Collection +, The Sherman Contemporary Art Foundation, Sydney, Australia
 2013 - Gentle Matter, Richard Koh Fine Art, Singapore
 2014 - The Art of Our Time: Masterpieces from the Guggenheim Collections, Guggenheim Museum Bilbao, Bilbao, Spain
 2014 - No Country: Contemporary Art for South and Southeast Asia, Centre for Contemporary Art, Singapore
 2014 - Medium at Large, Singapore Art Museum, Singapore
 2014 - Re: Collection, Museum of Arts and Design, New York, NY
 2014 - TRANSMISSION, Jim Thompson Art Center, Bangkok, Thailand
 2015 - Drawn from Nature, Asia Society Texas Center, Houston, TX
 2015 - Renaissance, Lille3000, Lille, France
 2015 - First Look: Collecting Contemporary at the Asian, The Asian Art Museum, San Francisco, CA
 2015 - "I Want Justice," United States Holocaust Memorial Museum, Washington, DC
 2015 - Selected works on exhibition, Minneapolis Institute of Art, Minneapolis, MN
 2016 - For the Love of Things: Still Life, Albright-Knox Art Gallery, Buffalo, NY (February 27 – May 29)
 2017 - Viva Arte Viva, 57th Venice Biennale, Venice, Italy (May 13 - November 26)

Residency programs
 2016 - Headlands Center for the Arts, Sausalito, CA (March – April)

Public collections
 M+ Museum of Visual Culture, Hong Kong
 Metropolitan Museum of Art, New York, NY
 Solomon R. Guggenheim Museum, New York, NY
 Centre Georges Pompidou, Paris, France
 Museum of Arts and Design, New York
 Smith College Museum of Art, Northampton, MA
 Singapore Art Museum, Singapore
 Queensland Art Gallery, Brisbane, Australia
 Bill & Melinda Gates Foundation, Seattle, WA
 Sherman Contemporary Art Foundation, Sydney, Australia
 Albright-Knox Art Gallery, Buffalo, NY
 San Francisco Museum of Modern Art, San Francisco, CA
 United States Holocaust Memorial Museum, Washington, DC
 The Asian Art Museum, San Francisco, CA

References

External links
 
 
 
 

Cambodian artists
Cambodian sculptors
Cambodian emigrants to the United States
21st-century Cambodian artists
20th-century Cambodian artists
21st-century American sculptors
20th-century American sculptors
Buddhist artists